Morsiano is a hamlet administratively a frazione of Villa Minozzo in the province of Reggio Emilia. Located in the tuscany-emilia apennines near the Mount Cusna slopes.

Overview
Morsiano has a population of 134 residents all year long (only the town not he entire frazione). Besides Morsiano there are other little villages which make up its frazione; the main ones are: Case Rossi, Monte Bore, Strinati, and Costalta.

History
The hamlet is first mentioned in 1302 as being a part of the medieval comune of Toano. A census of the 18th century estimated the population to be 395.
A little Marian niche dedicated to Our Lady dating back to the 1858 can be seen in the eastern part of this village.

References

See also
Frazioni of the Provincie of Reggio Emilia

Frazioni of the Province of Reggio Emilia